The siege of Belgrade was carried out by the Serbian rebels led by Karađorđe, seeking to overthrow the Ottoman government in the Sanjak of Smederevo, which was seated in the Belgrade Fortress. Following the decisive victories at Mišar (12–15 August) and Deligrad (September), the Serbian rebels marched towards Belgrade.

The battle
The plan of penetrating the town of Belgrade, through taking over the Sava, Varoš, Stambol and Vidin gates (see Gates of Belgrade), was presented by Konda Bimbaša to Karađorđe. Konda, well aware of the operating procedures of the Ottoman guard, took the leadership over volunteers to take over the Sava gate, accompanied by Uzun-Mirko. Karađorđe decided with the commanders that the attack be carried out on St. Andrew Day, during Eid al-Fitr, when the attention of the guards was lower. Rebel columns were set on each gate, to storm after the gate was taken, commanded by Miloje Petrović, Sima Marković, Vasa Čarapić, Stanoje Glavaš and Vule Ilić. At the estimated time, Konda, Uzun-Mirko, Petar Sremac, Nikola Stambolija, Karlovalija, Dragić, and Mladen headed out, followed by a detachment of volunteers, and then the main column of Miloje Petrović. Since they arrived unnoticed at the gate, Konda and Uzun-Mirko first climbed the rampart and jumped over the palisade, and headed towards the guards on a bypassing road. Met by an Ottoman patrol, they presented themselves as krdžalije, then proceeded to the town gates and guards where they divided into two groups. Uzun-Mirko and Konda attacked the guards, and the rest broke into the gate locks with axes. In the fight, Uzun-Mirko received two wounds, and Konda five, but they kept on. Even though shots were fired, the Turks in the town and at the rest of the gates did not suspect that a Serbian attack was in question, but that shots were fired for the holiday. After taking over the first gates, commandos went toward the Varoš Gate, at which time the Turks were alarmed. Most of the Turks tried to reach the Upper Fortress (Kalemegdan), while the resistance was provided by the so-called krdžalije. Uzun-Mirko and Konda also fought on the Varoš Gate, while Vasa Čarapić died taking over the Stambol Gate, and Stanoje Glavaš and Vule Ilić penetrated through the Vidin Gate, after which the rebels easily took over the town towards Kalemegdan.

Aftermath
In January 1807, the Ottomans accepted "Ičko's Peace", however, the rebels rejected it and sought Russian aid to their independence, signing a Russian-Serbian military alliance in June.

Gallery

References

Sources

Further reading
Tošković, J. (1930) O padu Beograda i Šapca, 26. decembra 1806. 26. januara 1807. god. Beograd

External links

Belgrade (1806)
Belgrade
First Serbian Uprising
Military history of Belgrade
1806 in Europe
Conflicts in 1806
November 1806 events
December 1806 events